Arlene Blum (born March 1, 1945) is an American mountaineer, writer, and environmental health scientist. She is best known for leading the first successful American ascent of Annapurna (I), a climb that was also an all-woman ascent. She led the first all-woman ascent of Denali ("Denali Damsels" expedition), and was the first American woman to attempt Mount Everest. She is Executive Director of the Green Science Policy Institute.

Early life
Blum was born in Davenport, Iowa, and raised from the age of five on in Chicago by her Orthodox Jewish mother and grandparents. In the early 1960s, she attended Reed College in Portland, Oregon. Her first climb was in Washington, where she failed to reach the summit of Mount Adams. However, she persevered, climbing throughout her college days. She was rejected from an Afghanistan expedition in 1969, with its leader writing to her, "One woman and nine men would seem to me to be unpleasant high on the open ice, not only in excretory situations but in the easy masculine companionship which is so vital a part of the joy of an expedition." In 1970, she requested to join a high altitude expedition, but was told that she was welcome to come as far as the base camp to "help with the cooking." However, she was able to go climbing as part of her research for her senior thesis, which was on the topic of volcanic gases on Oregon's Mount Hood. Blum was graduated from Reed in 1966 and attended MIT and UC Berkeley, where she earned a PhD in biophysical chemistry in 1971. After graduate school, Blum embarked on what she called the "endless winter" – spending more than a year climbing peaks all over the world.

Major climbs
Blum was part of the first all-woman team to ascend Alaska's Denali in 1970. She was deputy leader for the ascent. She participated in a 1976 expedition up Mount Everest as part of the American Bicentennial Everest Expedition, but did not reach the summit. In 1978, she organized a team of eleven women to climb the tenth highest mountain in the world, Annapurna (I) in Nepal which, until then, had been climbed by only eight people (all men). It was called American Women's Himalayan Expeditions – Annapurna. They raised money for the trip in part by selling T-shirts with the slogan "A woman's place is on top". The first summit team, comprising Vera Komarkova and Irene Miller (now Beardsley) and Sherpas Mingma Tsering and Chewang Ringjing, reached the top at 3:30 p.m. on October 15, 1978. The second summit team, Alison Chadwick-Onyszkiewicz and Vera Watson, died during this climb. After the event, Blum wrote a book about her experience on Annapurna, called Annapurna: A Woman's Place.

She led the first expedition to climb Bhrigupanth in the Indian Himalayas, leading a team of Indian and American women. She then attempted what she called the "Great Himalayan Traverse", a two-thousand-mile journey across the treacherous but beautiful peaks of the Himalayas from Bhutan to India. She crossed the Alps from Yugoslavia to France, bearing her baby Annalise on her back in a backpack.

Science policy work
As a researcher at the University of California, Berkeley, in the late 1970s, Blum's research contributed to the regulation of two cancer-causing chemicals used as flame retardants on children's sleepwear. Blum taught at Stanford University, Wellesley College, and the University of California, Berkeley.

After a long hiatus, Blum returned to science and policy work in 2006—when her daughter started college—and her memoir Breaking Trail: A Climbing Life was published. She discovered that the same Tris her research had helped remove from children's pajamas was back in California couches and baby products.

In 2007 Blum co-founded the Green Science Policy Institute (GSP) with the goal of bringing scientific research results into policy decisions to protect human health and the environment from toxic chemicals. As executive director of the Green Science Policy Institute, Blum and her team have led several successful national and international campaigns against the use of toxic chemicals, particularly halogenated flame retardants.

Blum has published articles about science policy in The New York Times, Los Angeles Times, The Huffington Post, and Science magazine.

GSP projects
 Helping create safer standards for consumer products, including bedding materials, furniture, and baby products.
 Reducing the use of toxic chemicals in buildings by informing architects and builders of alternative materials, building codes, and the adverse health effects associated with exposure to flame retardants.
 Working with Chinese scientists, industry leaders, academics, and government to create greater awareness of the growing chemical-flame-retardant industry in China.
 Conducting research on exposure to toxic chemicals and health of fire fighters, flight attendants, and U.S. and Chinese workers.

Writing and awards
Her first book, Annapurna: A Woman's Place was included in Fortune Magazine's 2005 list of "The 75 Smartest Business Books We Know" and chosen by National Geographic Adventure Magazine as one of the 100 top adventure books of all time. Her award-winning memoir, Breaking Trail: A Climbing Life tells the story of how Blum realized improbable dreams among the world's highest mountains, in the chemistry laboratory, and in public policy. Blum's books can also be viewed as works that contribute to showing the hardships faced by women scientists in a male dominated field.

Blum's awards include a Purpose Prize to those over 60 who are solving society's greatest problems, National Women's History Project selection as one of "100 Women Taking the Lead to Save Our Planet" and a Gold Medal from the Society of Woman Geographers, an honor previously given to only eight other women including Amelia Earhart, Margaret Mead, and Mary Leakey. Breaking Trail received an Honorable Mention from the National Outdoor Book Award in 2005.

Arlene Blum is the founder of the annual Berkeley Himalayan Fair and the Burma Village Assistance Project. She serves on the boards of the Society for the Preservation of Afghan Archeology; ISET, an organization dedicated to solving climate, water and disaster problems in South Asia; and the advisory boards for Project REED
which builds libraries in Asia, Environmental Building News, and the Plastic Pollution Coalition.

Blum was the winner of the Sierra Club's Francis P. Farquhar Mountaineering Award for 1982.

On April 7, 2012, the American Alpine Club inducted Blum into its Hall of Mountaineering Excellence at an award ceremony in Golden, Colorado.

Quotes

"With a global and virtual expedition team, we are attempting challenging and important mountains and reaching for the summit of a healthier world to benefit us all."—Purpose Prize profile
"The health and environmental problem from such chemicals could be as threatening as climate change, but I believe it is a problem that can be solved relatively easily. It's a matter of informing the public – and political will."—Purpose Prize profile
"My new adventure in science and policy work is the most challenging and important of my life and I feel lucky to look out at the horizon and see endless rows of mountains to climb."—Reed 100th Anniversary Festschrift Volume
"In America, foods, drugs and pesticides are regulated, you may say they are not well enough regulated, but you really have to provide information because those are the things that go into our mouths. Other chemicals like flame retardants are not regulated, there are not really health requirements but they go into our bodies the same way." -Arlene Blum, as interviewed in Stink! Movie

Personal life

Blum lives and works in Berkeley, California. She has a daughter, Annalise Blum, a 2010 graduate of Stanford University in environmental engineering.  In 2017 Annalise earned a Ph.D. in Civil Engineering at Tufts University.

External links
Arlene Blum official website
Green Science Policy Institute website
Purpose Prize Profile
Article about Arlene Blum in Reed College Magazine
Interview with Arlene Blum for Breaking Trail
Dashka Slater, "Arlene Blum's Crusade Against Household Toxins", The New York Times, September 9, 2012.

References 

Reed College alumni
Massachusetts Institute of Technology alumni
UC Berkeley College of Chemistry alumni
Living people
1945 births
American mountain climbers
Female climbers
Environmental scientists
American non-fiction environmental writers
Jewish American writers
Sportspeople from Berkeley, California
Writers from Berkeley, California
Activists from California
Sierra Club awardees
Members of the Society of Woman Geographers
American women scientists
American scientists
American women writers
21st-century American Jews
21st-century American women